Victoria "Vicky" Elaine Broadribb MBE (12 June 1976 - 2005) was an English Paralympic swimmer who competed for Great Britain at international level events.

Broadribb was born with a condition called spondyloepiphyseam dysplasia, it is a rare form of dyplasia which causes bone deformities and short stature.

References

1976 births
2005 deaths
Sportspeople from Birmingham, West Midlands
Paralympic swimmers of Great Britain
English female swimmers
Swimmers at the 1996 Summer Paralympics
Swimmers at the 2000 Summer Paralympics
Medalists at the 1996 Summer Paralympics
Medalists at the 2000 Summer Paralympics
Members of the Order of the British Empire
Paralympic medalists in swimming
Paralympic gold medalists for Great Britain
Paralympic bronze medalists for Great Britain
British female freestyle swimmers
S2-classified Paralympic swimmers
20th-century British women